Mykhaylo Ivanovych Fomenko (born 19 September 1948) is a Ukrainian former association footballer and former head coach of the Ukraine national team. As a player, he was capped 24 times for the Soviet Union, and, as a head coach, became the second ever manager – after Oleh Blokhin – to take Ukraine to an international finals tournament, reaching UEFA Euro 2016.

Fomenko was famous for his coaching in Dynamo Kyiv, winning its first Ukrainian gold medals for the club, first Ukrainian Cup for the club and most notably, defeating Barcelona in the first leg of the Champions League tournament. Barcelona, under Johan Cruyff and with such star players as Ronald Koeman and Pep Guardiola, ended up to be finalist of that UEFA Champions League season.

Career

Playing 
Fomenko was an integral part of Dynamo Kyiv's achievements in the 1970s at the club level, which included hoisting the 1975 Winners Cup and Super Cup.

Coaching 
After graduating the Higher School of Coaches in Moscow in 1979, Fomenko has coached numerous Ukrainian clubs, most notably Dynamo Kyiv. With Fomenko the club won its first Ukrainian gold medals, first Ukrainian Cup both in 1993 and most notably, beating Barcelona in the very first leg of the Champions League tournament. Barcelona ended up to be finalist of that 39th season of the UEFA Champions League. Before that success, in the end of 1989, he promoted Georgian club Guria Lanchkhuti to the Soviet Top league and in 2001 reached Ukrainian Cup final with CSKA Kyiv what is the best result in club's history.

On 26 December 2012, Fomenko was given a one-year contract – with a possible second-year extension – as head coach of Ukraine national team after the Football Federation of Ukraine had failed to retain Harry Redknapp and Sven-Göran Eriksson for the role. Fomenko coached Ukraine to six 2014 FIFA World Cup qualification wins, coming against Poland (twice), Moldova, Montenegro, San Marino and France, as well as one draw against England.

After placing second in their qualifying group, Ukraine was matched against France in the second round of UEFA qualifiers. Despite winning the first leg 2–0 at home, Ukraine fell 3–0 away to lose 3–2 on aggregate, thus failing to make the 2014 World Cup finals. Despite this, Fomenko indicated he would like to continue is his role and lead Ukraine in its UEFA Euro 2016 qualifying campaign, and on 6 February 2014, the Football Federation of Ukraine announced it had extended his contract until the end of 2015.

Fomenko ultimately led Ukraine to successful qualification to the Euro 2016 finals in France after finishing in third place in its qualifying group, setting up a playoff matchup against Slovenia. Here, Ukraine won 3–1 on aggregate to ensure the nation's spot in France. Fomenko subsequently extended his contract to coach Ukraine up to Euro 2016 until 30 July 2016, though he was promised another extension should Ukraine perform well at Euro 2016. Ukraine, however, had a disastrous tournament, losing all three group stage matches, including a defeat against the then world champions Germany (0–2) and, most shockingly, a loss to Northern Ireland (0–2), which sent Ukraine to an early exit.

Honours

Player 
 Club
 Soviet Top League (3): 1974, 1975, 1977
 Soviet Cup (2): 1974, 1978
 UEFA Cup Winners' Cup: 1975
 UEFA Super Cup: 1975
 Merited Master of Sport of the USSR

 International
 Olympic Games 
 Bronze: 1976

Manager 
 Ukrainian Top League: 1993
 Ukrainian Cup
 Winner: 1993
 Runner-up: 2001

Managerial statistics

References

External links
Biography in Russian
Profile

1948 births
Living people
Association football defenders
Ukrainian footballers
Soviet footballers
Soviet Union international footballers
Soviet Top League players
FC Dynamo Kyiv players
FC Spartak Sumy players
FC Zorya Luhansk players
Olympic footballers of the Soviet Union
Footballers at the 1976 Summer Olympics
Olympic bronze medalists for the Soviet Union
Higher School of Coaches alumni
Ukrainian football managers
Soviet football managers
FC Frunzenets Sumy managers
FC Desna Chernihiv managers
FC Kryvbas Kryvyi Rih managers
Iraq national football team managers
FC Ahrotekhservis Sumy managers
FC Dynamo Kyiv managers
NK Veres Rivne managers
Expatriate football managers in Guinea
Guinea national football team managers
FC Arsenal Kyiv managers
FC Metalist Kharkiv managers
FC Metalurh Zaporizhzhia managers
SC Tavriya Simferopol managers
Ukrainian Premier League managers
Olympic medalists in football
Ukraine national football team managers
Ukrainian expatriate football managers
Medalists at the 1976 Summer Olympics
UEFA Euro 2016 managers
Sportspeople from Sumy Oblast